Stade Olympique l'Emyrne is a multi-purpose stadium in Antananarivo, Madagascar. It is currently used mostly for and football matches and hosts the homes matches of SO l'Emyrne, a former member of the THB Champions League. The stadium has a capacity 1,500 spectators.

References

Football venues in Madagascar
Buildings and structures in Antananarivo